Ambala City Assembly constituency is one of the 90 assembly seats of Haryana Legislative Assembly. Ambala city is a part of Ambala district.

Members of the Legislative Assembly
1977: Shiv Prashad, Janata Party
1982: Shiv Prashad, Bharatiya Janata Party
1987: Shiv Prashad, Bharatiya Janata Party
1991: Sumer Chand Bhatt, Indian National Congress
1996: Faqir Chand, Bharatiya Janata Party
2000: Veena, Bharatiya Janata Party
2005: Venod Sharma, Indian National Congress
2009: Venod Sharma, Indian National Congress
2014: Aseem Goel, Bharatiya Janata Party

Election results

2019

2014

References

External links 
 Ambala City (Haryana) Assembly constituency Elections, elections.in

Ambala
Ambala